The Church of the New Jerusalem was a former nineteenth-century Swedenborgian church located in downtown Philadelphia, Pennsylvania at 22nd and Chestnut Streets.

The church was erected in 1881 to designs by Theophilus Parsons Chandler. When the congregation diminished, the church closed in the mid-1980s, and the structure was reused in 1989 as office space. The National Trust for Historic Preservation profiled the structure as a good example of adaptive reuse: "The congregation worked closely with the buyer of the property, the Preservation Fund, and the Philadelphia Historical Commission to devise a design that would be sensitive to the historic fabric." The project "added two floors for office space and enclosed the interior space facing the chancel with a floor to- ceiling glass wall. Updated HVAC, electrical systems, and emergency equipment installed." "In an area of many churches, the successful conversion to office space was a welcome sight for many of the neighbors who had feared an abandoned church building."

The 1990 conversion by Mark B. Thompson Associates into  of executive office space with room for expansion for Graduate Health System Corporate Headquarters, and later occupied by the advertising agency The Weightman Group, which is also gone. "Two balconies were added in four of the six bays, leaving the altar area an unchanged space for reception.  A glass curtain wall was inserted in the interior to define the space and keep noise down. Additionally, a large spiral staircase and an elevator were placed to give access to all levels."

References 

Swedenborgian churches in Pennsylvania
Churches in Philadelphia
Churches completed in 1881
19th-century Swedenborgian church buildings
Victorian architecture in Pennsylvania
Center City, Philadelphia
1881 establishments in Pennsylvania